Last Smoke Before the Snowstorm is the debut studio album from English singer-songwriter Benjamin Francis Leftwich, it was released on 3 July 2011 in the United Kingdom. It peaked at No. 35 on the UK Albums Chart

Singles
"Box of Stones" was released as the first single on 19 June 2011. It peaked at No. 195 on the UK Singles Chart.
"Atlas Hands" was released as the second single on 5 September 2011.
"Pictures" was released as the third single on 20 February 2012.
 Years later, "Shine" was released as the fourth single in April 2014, when Norwegian electronic musician Kygo made a remix of the track.

Track listing

Chart performance
On 10 July 2011, Last Smoke Before the Snowstorm entered the UK Albums Chart at number 35.

Release history

References

External links 
Official website

2011 debut albums
Benjamin Francis Leftwich albums